Liolaemus bibronii, Bibron's tree iguana, is a species of lizard in the family  Liolaemidae. It is native to Argentina and Chile.

References

bibronii
Reptiles described in 1843
Reptiles of Argentina
Reptiles of Chile
Taxa named by Thomas Bell (zoologist)